Hermon is both a surname and a given name. Notable people with the name include:

Surname:
John Hermon, Royal Ulster Constabulary
Sylvia Hermon, Northern Ireland politician

Given name:
Hermon Henry Cook, Ontario lumber merchant and politician
Hermon di Giovanno, Greek painter
Hermon Atkins MacNeil, American sculptor
Hermon Hosmer Scott, American inventor
Hermon Williams, American college football coach